Anoma Gamage is a Sri Lankan politician, a member of the Parliament of Sri Lanka. She was appointed as the Deputy Minister of Irrigation and Agriculture in January 2015 and Deputy Minister of Petroleum and Petroleum Gas in September 2015 by President Maithripala Sirisena. Mrs. Gamage is married to United National Party National Organizer & Minister Daya Gamage.

Mrs. Gamage graduated from University of Peradeniya Bachelor's degree in Veterinary Medicine Science.

See also
List of political families in Sri Lanka

References

Living people
Sri Lankan Buddhists
Alumni of the University of Peradeniya
United National Party politicians
Members of the 14th Parliament of Sri Lanka
Members of the 15th Parliament of Sri Lanka
Deputy ministers of Sri Lanka
Women legislators in Sri Lanka
21st-century Sri Lankan women politicians
Women government ministers of Sri Lanka
Year of birth missing (living people)
Sinhalese politicians